The People's National Congress is a political party in the Maldives founded in January 2019. The party's formation was spearheaded by former President Abdulla Yameen Abdul Gayoom, who left the Progressive Party of Maldives due to a dispute with the party's leadership.

The PNC was founded with support from Yameen by Fonadhoo MP Abdul Raheem Abdulla, and was also joined by Nilandhoo MP Abdulla Khaleel. They then became president and vice president of the party, respectively, shortly after.

History 
The PNC formed an alliance with the PPM on 2 February 2019, and together operated as the "Progressive Congress Coalition".

The PNC won 3 seats in the 19th Parliament, namely Vice Presidents Mohamed Saeed (Maavah constituency) and Adam Shareef Umar (Maduvvari constituency), and Ibrahim Fazul Rasheed (Felidhoo constituency). Interim party leader Abdul Raheem Abdulla lost his seat in Fonadhoo constituency.

The party is scheduled to hold its Inaugural National Conference in late April 2019, where appointments for full-term party positions will be made. On 26 April 2019 the congress was held and former MP Ahmed Nihan Hussain Manik, former MP Ibrahim Shujau and former Economic Minister Mohamed Saeed was elected the vice-presidents of the party. However, after former MP Ahmed Nihan Hussain Manik departed the party, former Fenaka Managing Director Mohamed Nimal was appointed vice-president of PNC.

Election results

People's Majlis

References

External links 
 

Political parties established in 2019
Islamic political parties in the Maldives
2019 establishments in the Maldives